I Love You Jennifer B is the debut studio album by British experimental pop band Jockstrap. It was released through Rough Trade Records in September 2022 and received critical acclaim. It debuted and peaked at number 57 in the UK Albums Chart.

Recording 
On 14 June 2022, Jockstrap announced their debut LP entitled I Love You Jennifer B along with the release of the album's third single "Glasgow". In a statement, Taylor Skye stated that "Glasgow" is the band's "coming of age, moving forward, long-distance, traveling, beautiful bosk, wonderful thicket song." According to the band, the album consists of a "collection of Jockstrap tracks that have been three years in the making. Everything on it is pretty singular sounding so we hope there is a track on there for everyone and something that speaks to you and says 'I'm a banger'."

Critical reception

Track listing

Personnel 
Jockstrap
 Georgia Ellery 
 Taylor Skye 

Other performers
 Victoria Farrell-Reed, Nina Lim, Iveliana Ivanova, Gwyneth Helmes, Annie-May Page, Camille Saïd, Ella Fox, William Clark, Dom Ingham, Zoe Hodi, Nazli Erdogan, Johanna Burnheart, Freya Hicks, Isobel Doncaster, Sally Belcher, Felix Stephens, Evie Coplan, Jonah Spindel – strings
 Angus Webster – conductor

Charts

References

2022 debut albums
Rough Trade Records albums